Ida Fink (
1 November 1921 – 27 September 2011) was a Polish-born Israeli author who wrote about the Holocaust in Polish.

Biography
Ida Fink was born as Ida Landau in Zbaraż, Poland (now Zbarazh, Ukraine) on 1 November 1921 to a Polish-Jewish family. Her father, Ludwig Landau, was a physician and her mother, Fannie Landau, worked as a teacher in a local school. She was a student of music at the Lwów Conservatory, but her studies were halted by the German invasion of Poland in 1939. Landau and her family spent 1941–1942 in the Zbaraż ghetto, before escaping, along with her sister, with the help of Aryan papers. During those two years her mother also died of cancer. After the Holocaust, Landau married Bruno Fink and had a daughter, Miri Fink. In 1957, Fink and her family immigrated to Israel. They settled in Holon, where she worked as a music librarian and an interviewer for Yad Vashem. In 1958, she began publishing short stories in Polish-language press. In her final years, she resided in Ramat Aviv, a neighborhood of Tel Aviv.

Literary career
Fink began publishing her short studies in 1958 but published her first anthology only in 1987. She wrote in Polish, primarily on Holocaust themes. Her stories revolve around the terrible choices that the Jews had to make during the Nazi era and the hardships of Holocaust survivors after the war. Her short stories appeared twice on the Polish Matriculation Exam, Matura.

Films
A documentary about Ida Fink, The Garden that Floated Away, was produced by Israeli filmmaker Ruth Walk.

The 2008 film Spring 1941, directed by Uri Barbash, was based on her book Wiosna 1941.

Awards
In 2008, Fink was awarded the Israel Prize, for literature.

She has also won the Anne Frank Prize (1985), the Buchman Prize and the Sapir Prize.

Published work
 The Key Game (1986)
 A Scrap of Time and Other Stories (1987)
 The Journey (1990)
 Traces (1996)

See also
 List of Israel Prize recipients

References

External links

 Sara R. Horowitz, Biography of Ida Fink, Jewish Women's Encyclopedia
 Michael A. Rauch, Ida Fink: An Appreciation, The Forward, 17 October 2011
 Teaching the Holocaust through a story by Ida Fink 
 

1921 births
2011 deaths
Polish emigrants to Israel
Israeli people of Polish-Jewish descent
Israel Prize women recipients
Israel Prize in literature recipients
Israeli writers in Polish
20th-century Israeli women writers